The M7 cars are a series of bilevel rail cars of the National Railway Company of Belgium (SNCB). Developed from the M6 cars they are built by Bombardier Transportation and Alstom. The first car was delivered in September 2018.

History 
At 18th December 2015 the SNCB, Bombardier and Alstom concluded a contract to deliver up to 1362 bilevel rail cars of a new design. At the same time 445 cars were ordered obligatorily. The 65 motorized cars of this order are manufactured in Valenciennes by Alstom. Bombardier produces all the other cars in Bruges. The M7 cars shall be used in Belgium, the Netherlands and Luxembourg.

The orders were expanded by 204 cars in 2020 and by 98 cars in 2021.

Design 

Six different types of the M7 car are produced:

 AB are middle cars with first and second class.
 B are middle cars with exclusively second class.
 BDx are control cars with multi-function area and space for disabled people, with an entry height at 63 cm
 BD are cars with multi-function area and space for disabled people, with an entry height at 76 cm
 Bx are control cars with space for disabled people, with an entry height at 76 cm
 Bmx are motorized end cars.

The concept of the M7 cars contains either trains formed of several middle cars and one or two Bmx motorized railcars or push–pull trains with conventional locomotives. These trains shall be capable to use the older M6 rolling stock.

All cars are adapted to the Belgian standard Railway platform height of 760 mm.

References 

Bombardier Transportation rail vehicles
Alstom rolling stock
Railway coaches of Belgium